Artem Filimonov (born 21 February 1994) is a professional Ukrainian football midfielder.

He is a son of Ukrainian footballer Denys Filimonov.

Career
Filimonov is product of youth team system of FC Dnipro. Made his debut for FC Chornomorets in the game against FC Illichivets Mariupol on 27 February 2015 in the Ukrainian Premier League.

On 21 June 2019, Filimonov joined Polish club Olimpia Grudziądz. However, already on 19 August 2019, the club announced that he had left the club again by mutual agreement.

References

External links

Artem Filimonov at Footballdatabase

1994 births
Living people
Sportspeople from Rivne
Ukrainian footballers
Association football midfielders
Ukrainian expatriate footballers
Expatriate footballers in Cyprus
Expatriate footballers in Belarus
Expatriate footballers in Latvia
Expatriate footballers in Poland
Ukrainian expatriate sportspeople in Cyprus
Ukrainian expatriate sportspeople in Belarus
Ukrainian expatriate sportspeople in Latvia
Ukrainian expatriate sportspeople in Poland
Ukrainian Premier League players
Belarusian Premier League players
FC Dnipro players
FC Chornomorets Odesa players
FC Karpaty Lviv players
Pafos FC players
FC Gomel players
FK Ventspils players
Olimpia Grudziądz players
Latvian Higher League players